Breton is a Brittonic Celtic language in the Indo-European family, and its grammar has many traits in common with these languages. Like most Indo-European languages it has grammatical gender, grammatical number, articles and inflections and like the other Celtic languages, Breton has two genders: masculine and feminine. In addition to the singular–plural system, it also has a singulative–collective system, similar to Welsh. Unlike the other Brittonic languages, Breton has both a definite and indefinite article, whereas Welsh and Cornish lack an indefinite article and unlike the other extant Celtic languages, Breton has been influenced by French.

Nouns

Gender 
Like in most other Indo-European languages, Breton nouns belong to distinct grammatical genders/noun classes: masculine and feminine.

The gender of a noun is hard to predict, and for some words can even vary from dialect to dialect. However, certain semantic groups of word tend to belong to a particular gender. For example, names of countries and cites often are feminine, whereas most divisions of time are masculine. Some suffixes denote the same gender:

Number
Nouns may exist in as many as four numbers: collective / singulative (see below) or singular / plural.
 
An example of this is singular  "eye", plural  "eyes", dual  "(pair of) eyes". Dual forms themselves can have a plural form, for example,  "(pairs of) eyes".

Singulative
A distinctive and unusual feature of Brythonic languages is a singulative marker, which in Breton is marked with the feminine suffix . While the collective noun , for instance, means "trees (collectively)", the singulative  means "(a single) tree". The latter can even be made into a regular plural  with the meaning "several trees (individually)".

Diminutive
Breton forms diminutive nouns using the suffix  with the plural formed by reduplication of the suffix , for example,  "meadow",  "little meadow",  "little meadows" (cf. non-diminutive plural  "meadows").

Articles
In Breton, the article has both definite and indefinite forms. This is unlike other Celtic languages, which have only definite articles. The definite article is  before dentals, vowels and unpronounced ,  before  and  elsewhere. Examples of this include  "the fire",  "the mouse",  "the chair". The indefinite article, derived from the number  "one", follows the same pattern of final consonants:  "a fire",  "a mouse",  "a chair".
 
The definite article may contract with preceding prepositions, for instance  "in" +  gives  "in the".

Adjectives
These suffixes cause preceding consonants to undergo provection (see  "wet" and  "red" in the table). "good" and  "bad" are examples of adjectives that can have irregular forms.

In addition to the above forms, some adjectives can have separate equative forms, for example,  "as big",  "as good",  "as bad". More regular equatives are formed with  "as", for example,  "as wet",  "as bad". Breton also possesses an exclamative suffix , as in  "(how) big!",  "(how) wet!",  "(how) good!", but this is obsolete except in certain expressions.

Adverbs
Adverbs in Breton do not inflect.

Prepositions
As in other Celtic languages, prepositions in Breton are either simple or complex and may or may not inflect for person, number and gender. Historically, inflected prepositions derive from the contraction between a preposition and a personal pronoun.
 
In general, simple prepositions that inflect take one of two possible groups of suffixes. The stem employed for the third person forms may be different from that of other persons. Inflected prepositions distinguish gender in the third person singular.

 
Simple prepositions that do not inflect include  and  "from",  "before" and  "after".
 
Complex prepositions inflect by means of interfixes, whereby the nominal second element is preceded by a pronominal form. This is similar to how  can become  in archaic English. Mutations may be triggered following the various pronominal forms.

Conjunctions 
Certain conjunctions have an additional form used when followed by a vowel, such as  "and" becoming  and  "than" becoming . A conjunction is usually followed by the particle  when preceding a verb, for example,  "and he fell",  "because he fell", although this is not the case for  "that, if",  "if",  "if, when, because".

Pronouns

Personal
Personal pronouns may be strong, post-clitic head or pre-clitic head. Strong pronouns have the same distribution as a full noun phrase and may be subjects, objects or prepositional objects. Post-clitic head pronouns tend to follow finite verbs, nouns or inflected prepositions. Pre-clitic head pronouns function as object pronouns preceding verb phrases and possessive determiners preceding noun phrases.

As in Welsh and French, the second person plural pronoun is used in the singular to show politeness. A large part of central Brittany has lost the second person singular  altogether and uses  for all second person reference.
The partitive paraphrase has replaced the traditional post-clitic object pronoun in every dialect except Gwenedeg (Vannetais), except when object is fronted for emphasis. The inflected forms of the preposition  ‘of’ placed after the verb are substituted for the traditional object pronoun, e.g.  ‘Yannig saw them in town’, more literally ‘In the town Yannig saw of them’, and occasionally function as subjects (with intransitive, usually negative, verbs).

Demonstrative 
Demonstrative pronouns display three degrees of proximity as well as gender and number.

Demonstrative determiners are post-head clitics used in conjunction with the definite article.

Indefinite
Indefinite pronouns may be positive, such as  "some, ones" and  "all" and negative, such as  "nothing" and  "nowhere", and may be preceded by a determiner, for example  "some" ("the ones") and  "your" ("your ones").

Verbs

Regular conjugation
Breton verbs can be conjugated to show tense, aspect, mood, person and number by adding suffixes to the verbal stem, seen in the following table.
 

Additional suffixes may form the verbal noun. The most common of these are:
 
  as in  "say",  "can, be able",  "hear, smell"
  as in  "drink",  "dress",  "write"
  as in  "eat",  "learn",  "give"
 
For other verbs, the stem itself is also the verbnoun, for example,  "wait",  "read",  "understand".
 
Verbs also have a past participle formed with a suffix and a present participle form comprising the verbal noun preceded by the particle , which causes a mixed mutation.
 
Most verbs are regular and stray little from the usual patterns. The table shows and example of the regular verb  "eat" (verbal stem ).

Irregular conjugation
A few common verbs are irregular, including  "do".

 "go" has irregular conjugation.

The verb  "know" is also irregular. In addition to the forms below, it also has a number of other possible variant roots.

 "be" is another irregular verb, which is conjugated for additional tense or aspect distinctions.

Compound tenses 
,  and  can all be used as auxiliary verbs.
 
In the present, Breton (like Cornish and Irish but unlike the other Celtic language) distinguishes between the simple and progressive present. The progressive present, on the other hand, is formed with the present situative of  combined with present participle.

Negation 

Unable to be negated by the previous structure, infinitives can be expressed negatively by means of a compound phrases, so that, for instance,  "eat" may become  "not eat" (literally, "pass without eating") and   "run"  "not run" (literally, "keep from running").  is occasionally used, however, to negate infinitives.

Numbers

Cardinal numbers 
Similar to other Celtic languages, Breton has an underlying vigesimal counting system. "Two", "three" and "four" and derivative numbers have separate masculine and feminine forms. Interesting irregularities in the system are  "eighteen", literally "three sixes", and  "fifty", literally "half a hundred" (compare Welsh  "two nines" and  "half a hundred").

Ordinal numbers 
A gender distinction can again be shown with some ordinal numbers.

Mutations 

The main mutations cause the following changes:

References

 
 Jouitteau, M. (2009-now) ARBRES, Breton wiki grammar on-line, IKER, CNRS.
 Press, I. (1986) A Grammar of Modern Breton (Mouton De Gruyter)
 Denez, P. (1971) Kentelioù brezhoneg : eil derez, Al Liamm
 Denez, P. (1977) Étude structurale d'un parler breton: Douarnenez, thèse (3 vol.), Université de Rennes
 Denez, P. (1985) Geriadur brezhoneg Douarnenez, 4 vol., Mouladurioù Hor Yezh
 Denez, P. (1987) Mont war-raok gant ar brezhoneg, MHY